Brian C. McGing is a papyrologist and ancient historian, who specialises in the Hellenistic period. He is Regius Professor of Greek at Trinity College, Dublin. He is editor of the college's journal of the classical world, Hermathena.

In 2004, McGing was elected a Member of the Royal Irish Academy (MRIA).

Selected publications
Polybius' Histories. Oxford University Press, Oxford, 2010.
The limits of ancient biography. Classical Press of Wales, 2006. (ed. with Judith Mossman)
"Population and proselytism. How many Jews were there in the ancient world?" in John R. Barlett (ed.), Jews in the Hellenistic and Roman cities. London, 2002. pp. 88–106.
"Revolt Egyptian style: Internal opposition to Ptolemaic rule", Archiv für Papyrusforschung und Verwandte Gebiete, 43 (1997), pp. 273–314.
Greek papyri from Dublin. Bonn, 1995.
"Appian's Mithridateios", Aufstieg und Niedergang der Römischen Welt II, 34.1, Bonn, 1993. pp. 496–522.
"Melitian monks at Labla", Tyche 5 (1990), pp. 67–94.
The foreign policy of Mithridates VI Eupator King of Pontus. Leiden, 1986.

References 

Papyrologists
Academics of Trinity College Dublin
Living people
Year of birth missing (living people)
Members of the Royal Irish Academy